Somfy is a French group of companies that were founded in 1969. First established in Cluses in Haute-Savoie, it is today one of the largest manufacturers and supplier of controllers and drives for entrance gates, garage doors, blinds and awnings. They also produce other home automation products such as security devices.

They are a member of home automation committees such as Matter, formerly Connected Home over IP, (with others such as Google, Apple and Amazon), Thread Group and the Connectivity Standards Alliance, formerly Zigbee Alliance.

References

Home automation
Proprietary hardware
Home automation companies
Heating, ventilation, and air conditioning companies